The George Ryga Award for Social Awareness in Literature is a literary award given to a British Columbian author "who has achieved an outstanding degree of social awareness in a new book published in the preceding calendar year." The prize was created in 2004 by Allan Twigg of BC Book World along with John Lent of Okanagan College and Ken Smedley, then working for the George Ryga Centre Society. In 2014 Alan Twigg took over responsibility for the award after the sale of Ryga House. Originally the prize included a sculpture/plaque by sculptor, Reg Kienast, entitled The Censor's Golden Rope. Now it includes a cash award of $2,500.

Nominees and winners

References

Canadian non-fiction literary awards
Awards established in 2004
2004 establishments in British Columbia